The American sitcom television series Soap originally aired 85 episodes over four seasons from September 13, 1977, to April 20, 1981. The series is a parody of soap operas and features a large ensemble cast.

The show ran for 85 episodes in its original ABC broadcasts, but its syndication package included 93 episodes (several one-hour ABC episodes, mostly from the condensed Season 4, were split into half-hour syndication episodes).

There were also four Soap retrospective specials, which were clip shows designed to catch viewers up with the previous seasons' story--lines. The first of these was broadcast on December 20, 1977, after the first 13 shows had aired. The other three were shown at the beginning of each new season (on August 31, 1978, just before Season 2; on August 30, 1979, just before Season 3; and on October 29, 1980, just before the shortened Season 4.)

Series overview

Episodes 
The 93-episode version of the episode list is shown here, with an indication of what the episode numbers would have been in the show's original run displayed in the last column.

Season 1 (1977–78)

Season 2 (1978–79)

Season 3 (1979–80)

Season 4 (1980–81) 
This season was originally shown as 16 episodes of which six were one hour in length. When the one-hour episodes were standardized into half-hour episodes this yielded 22 episodes.

References

External links 

 

Lists of American romance television series episodes
Lists of American sitcom episodes
Lists of soap opera episodes